Diego Antonio Ochoa Camargo (born 5 June 1993) is a Colombian racing cyclist, who currently rides for UCI Continental team .

Major results

2010
 2nd Road race, National Junior Road Championships
2013
 3rd Overall Coupe des nations Ville Saguenay
 5th Circuito de Getxo
 6th Overall Tour de Gironde
 7th Overall Vuelta Ciclista a León
1st  Mountains classification
2014
 1st  Road race, National Under-23 Road Championships
 1st  Mountains classification Tour de Gironde
 1st Prologue Giro della Valle d'Aosta
 8th Overall Vuelta Mexico Telmex
1st Stage 3
 10th Overall Tour do Brasil
2016
 2nd Overall Vuelta a la Independencia Nacional
1st  Points classification
1st Stage 6
2018
 3rd Road race, National Road Championships
2019
 5th Overall Tour de Taiwan

References

External links

1993 births
Living people
Colombian male cyclists
Sportspeople from Boyacá Department
21st-century Colombian people